Muziektheater Transparant is a Flemish theatre company founded in 1994. They produce music theatre and their own versions of operas. The artistic directors are Guy Coolen and Wouter Van Looy. Among the past and current composers in residence are Wim Henderickx, Jan Van Outryve, Eric Sleichim (of ),  and Annelies Van Parys.

Transparant, which has its office and rehearsal room in Matterhorn (Antwerp), brings artists and ensembles together. It is strong internationally oriented and delivers productions with artistic and social relevance for a large audience.

Productions 
 The Lighthouse (1998) by Peter Maxwell Davies
 Manicuur (2001) by Jan Goovaerts and 
 Il Re Pastore (2001) by Wolfgang Amadeus Mozart
 Ik Vlieg (2001) by Jan Van Outryve and 
 Little Orfeo (2002)
 Radio Ping-Pong (2002) by John Torso
 Carmen (2002) by Stef Kamil Carlens and Oscar Van Woensel
 Achilleus (2002) by Wim Henderickx and Imme Dros
 L'Arianna (2002) by Claudio Monteverdi
 Weisse Rose (2002) by Udo Zimmerman
 Zone Orfeo (2002) after Monteverdi
 Infito Nero (2002-2003) by Salvatore Sciarrino
 Antigona (2003) by Tommaso Traetta
 Sestina (2003) by Monteverdi
 Men in tribulation (2003) by Eric Sleichim and Jan Fabre
 Mr. Emmet takes a walk (2003) with Maxwell Davies and David Pountney
 Enoch Arden (2003) by Richard Strauss and Alfred Tennyson
 Dan ben ik straks zo'n diva (2003) after Strauss and George Frideric Handel
 Leven in hel (2003) by Ramsey Nasr and Joost Kleppe
 Drift (2003) after Monteverdi
 Peer Gynt (2003) by Edvard Grieg and Henrik Ibsen
 Einstein For Aliens (2003-2004) by David Moss and Hebbeltheater (Berlin)
 Ding (2004) by John Torso and Pat Van Hemelrijck
 Nest (2004)
 Jakob Lenz (2004) by Wolfgang Rihm after a libretto by Michael Fröhling based on Lenz by Georg Büchner
 Arthur / De Queeste (2004) by Jan Van Outryve
 Gli Amori d'Apollo e di Dafne (2004) by Francesco Cavalli and Giovanni Francesco Busenello
 Dido (2004) by Jan Van Outryve, Purni Morell and Wouter Van Looy
 The Medium (2004) by Maxwell Davies
 The Fairy Queen (2004) by Henry Purcell
 Arthur (2005) by Jan Van Outryve
 Von Tripp (2005) by Monteverdi
 Saulpain (2005) by G. F. Handel
 Opera langs de achterdeur (2005)
 Nada Brahma (2005) by Senjan Jansen and Oscar van den Boogaard
 Jullie die weten (2005) by Mozart and Stefan Hertmans
 Blauwbaards Burcht (2005) after Béla Bartók and Béla Balász
 De gelukkige prins (2006) after Franz Schubert, Mozart and Oscar Wilde
 Muziek Fabriek (2006) by Jan Van Outryve
 Intra-Muros [IM Pasolini] (2006) by Eric Sleichim and Peter Verhelst
 Het meisje de jongen de rivier (2006) by Jan Van Outryve, Paul Verrept and Wouter Van Looy
 Feedback (2006) by Bert Bernaerts
 Romeinse Tragedies (2006) by Eric Sleichim, William Shakespeare and 
 RUHE (2006) by Franz Schubert, Van Parys, Armando and Hans Sleutelaar
 La Mort de Sainte Alméenne / L'Ideé (2006) by Arthur Honegger and Max Jacob
 Een totale Entführung (2006) by Mozart, Wim Henderickx and Ramsey Nasr
 Babar/Le Fils des Etoiles (2007) after Francis Poulenc and Erik Satie
 Alles Liebe (2007) after Samson by G. F. Handel
 Waar is mijn ziel? (2007) by Monteverdi
 Villa Vivaldi (2007) by Jan Van Outryve after Antonio Vivaldi
 Void (2007) by Wim Henderickx, Hans Op de Beeck and Wouter Van Looy
 Wolpe! (2007) by Stefan Wolpe, Johan Bossers, Caroline Petrick and 
 (after) The Fairy Queen (2008) after Henry Purcell and William Shakespeare
 L'Esprit Messiaen (2008) by Olivier Messiaen
 Kafka Fragments (2008) after Gyorgy Kurtag and Franz Kafka
 Lamentations & Whispers (2008) by Orlandus Lassus, Joachim Brackx and Ramsey Nasr
 Pour vos beaux yeux (2008) by Joachim Brackx, Eric Sleichim, Jan Van Outryve and Van Parys
 An Index of Memories (2009) by Van Parys
 Century Songs (2009)
 Medea (2009) by Wim Henderickx, Peter Verhelst and 
 Een nieuw Requiem (2009) by Mozart, Christian Köhler and Jeroen Brouwers
 Die Entführung aus dem Paradies (2009) by Joachim Brackx and Oscar van den Boogaard
 De legende van de witte slang (2009) with Shanghai Peking Opera Troupe
 Insect (2009) by Eric Thielemans
 Autopsie van een gebroken hart (2009) by An De Donder and Dominique Pauwels
 Over de bergen (2009) by Corrie van Binsbergen and Josse De Pauw
 Porselein (2009–2010) by Jan Van Outryve, Paul Verrept and Wouter Van Looy
 Orlando (2010) by Ludovico Ariosto, Vivaldi and Jan Van Outryve
 Een Oresteia (2010) by Iannis Xenakis and Van Parys
 L'Orfeo (2010) after Monteverdi
 Blond Eckbert (2010) by Judith Weir and Wouter Van Looy
 Utopia 47 (2010–2011) by Eric Sleichim
 Venus and Adonis (2011–2012)
 Opera Buffa (2011–2012)
 Pelléas et Mélisande (2011–2012)
 De waterafsluiter (2012–2013)
 Escorial (2012–2013)
 Koningin van de nacht (2012–2013)
 Lilith (2012–2013)
 O mio core (2012–2013)
 Songs of War (2012–2013)
 Territoria (2012–2013)
 De Koningin Zonder Land (2014-2015) Wim Henderickx and Wouter Van Looy
 Nightshade: Aubergine (2016-2017) with Claron McFadden
 Revelations (2017) Wim Henderickx and Wouter Van Looy
 Harriet (2018) by Hilda Paredes was given by in Huddersfield, UK. The libretto came from poetry by Mayra Santos-Febres and dialogue from Lex Bohlmeijer.

References

External links 
 

Theatre companies in Belgium
Opera companies
1994 establishments in Belgium
Music organisations based in Belgium